The Thiérache is a region of France and Belgium united by similar geography and architecture, including the presence of hedgerows, grassland, hilly terrain, scattered settlements, and traditionally-built stone or brick houses with stone dividing walls and slate roofs.

Located in the north-east of the Aisne department, it also spills over into parts of the Nord and Ardennes departments and the Walloon provinces of Hainaut and Namur. Its overall location is the western foothills of the Ardennes massif. Historically, its capital was Guise, even though its largest settlement is now Fourmies. It is bisected by the route nationale 2 between Paris and Brussels, whilst another important local route is the route nationale 43 between Cambrai and Charleville-Mézières.

French sartorial heritage 
The region was a pivotal centre of mulquinerie (linen weaving).

 
Geography of Aisne
Geography of Ardennes (department)
Geography of Nord (French department)
Geography of Hauts-de-France
Geography of Hainaut (province)
Geography of Namur (province)
Regions of Wallonia
Areas of Belgium
Geographical, historical and cultural regions of France